Margaret Jennings may refer to:
Margaret Jennings (cricketer) (born 1949), Australian cricketer
Margaret Jennings (scientist) (1904–1994), British scientist
Margaret Jennings (racing driver) (née Allan; 1909–1998), Scottish racing driver and journalist
Margaret Jennings, possible victim of Black Widows of Liverpool